Carmela Gross (born 1946) or Maria do Carmo da Costa Gross is a Brazilian visual artist and educator. She is noted for her avant-garde productions on visual arts that focus on pop art, visual vocabulary of children, architecture and the urban landscape.

Biography 
Gross was born Maria do Carmo da Costa Gross in São Paulo in February 1946. She completed her Fine Arts degree at the Fundação Armando Álvares Penteado (FAAP) in 1969. In the same year, she had already participated in the Bienal de São Paulo for the second time. 

After graduating, Gross worked as a teacher. From 1971 to 1972, she taught at the School of Fine Arts of São Paulo. She then completed her Masters in Fine Arts in 1981 and her doctorate in arts in 1987 at the Universidade de São Paulo. She also became a faculty of the university's Department of Plastic Arts from 1972 to 2015.

Artistic career 
Gross career began during a period of social upheaval in Brazil. Her contemporaries had to contend with state censorship and violence perpetrated by series of dictatorial regimes that began in 1964. Gross participated in collective movements that used public space as artistic platforms. Among the exhibitions she participated in during this period were the Art in Square Movement and Bandeiras na Praça. During the 1969 Bienal, she also exhibited a large metallic sculpture covered by a tarpaulin. This art production called A carga ("Cargo") did not only focus on the sculptures but also the connotation of threat and danger. Notable pieces in this exhibition include Presunto ("Ham") and Barril ("Barrel"), which explored the urban landscape characterized by ambivalence between opacity and morbidity. In 1977, she produced a video featuring a black gouache composed of images depicted on the screen orthogonally, connoting a prison.  

Gross is known for her art installations that feature neon. A recent exhibition, for example, featured Figurantes/Extras, which focused on the apotheosis of war with its procession of doubtful figures. The figures included those listed by Karl Marx in The Eighteenth Brumaire of Louis Napoleon such as people without ambition, decadent ruffians, con men, and pickpockets, among others. She is also noted for her drawing, paintings, lithography, stamps, photocopies and video art. Early in her artistic career, she focused on productions exhibited in public spaces (e.g. Escada-Escola) and these often involved proposition of plastic activities for children as well as themes that explore education. Her art productions that use plastic also often articulate a critical look at the social and political dimensions of the modern urban landscape.

Gross's works have been chronicled by Ana Maria de Moraes Belluzzo, who elaborated on her response to the modern contradictions of art. Belluzo also cited the series of artworks called Quasares, which explored the dimensions that arise as consequences of recent industrialization and technology.

Art productions

References 

1946 births
Brazilian contemporary artists
Brazilian women painters
Academic staff of the University of São Paulo
People from São Paulo
20th-century Brazilian painters
20th-century Brazilian women artists
Living people